Gervais may refer to:

People
 Gervais (name), list of people with the given name or surname

Places
 Gervais, Oregon
 Gervais Lake, a lake in Minnesota
 Gervais Township, Minnesota
 Gervais Road, part of 170 Street, Edmonton, Alberta, Canada

Other uses
Gervais, a French cheese producer which merged with Groupe Danone in 1967
Gervais High School, a public high school in Gervais, Oregon
Petit Gervais, a character in the novel Les Misérables

See also
 Gervase (disambiguation)
 Gervais's fruit-eating bat 
 Gervais's funnel-eared bat
 Saint Gervais (disambiguation)
 Gervaise (disambiguation)
 Gervasius and Protasius, 2nd century Christian martyrs